The Intercollegiate Fencing Association (IFA) was the oldest collegiate fencing conference in the United States. It is affiliated with the Eastern College Athletic Conference (ECAC).

Membership
The IFA has 11 members. Cornell only competes in women's fencing; the remaining 10 teams participate with men's and women's teams
 Brandeis Judges
 Brown Bears - will leave the IFA in 2020 upon cutting their varsity fencing program
 Columbia Lions
 Cornell Big Red
 Harvard Crimson
 MIT Engineers
 NYU Violets
 Penn Quakers
 Princeton Tigers
 Vassar Brewers
 Yale Bulldogs

Six of the members of the IFA are also members of the Ivy League, and all of the Ivy universities with Division I fencing programs are also members of the IFA.  Dartmouth College and Brown University do not have varsity fencing programs.

IFA Championship Tournament
The 2007 IFA Championship tournament was hosted by Princeton University on Saturday March 3, 2007. Because no suitable venue at Princeton was available, the tournament was held nearby at the Lawrenceville School.

There are 9 trophies given to teams at the annual IFA Championships in the following categories:

 Men's Foil
 Men's Épée
 Men's Saber
 Women's Foil
 Women's Épée
 Women's Saber
 Men's 3-Weapon Team
 Women's 3-Weapon Team
 Men's and Women's 6-Weapon Team

In 1994 Stephen Kovacs (1972–2022), a Columbia saber fencer and later a fencing coach, became the first fencer to win four consecutive IFA championships.

Among these awards, the most prestigious is the trophy given to the Men's Foil
team champion, currently Yale University. This trophy is known as the Little Iron Man and is the oldest trophy still awarded for any collegiate sport in the United States. It was cast in 1893 and has been awarded to the IFA Men's Foil team champion since 1896.

The 2008 IFA Championship Tournament was hosted by Columbia University on Sunday February 24, 2008.

The 2009 IFA Championship Tournament was hosted by Brandeis University on Saturday, February 28, 2009.

The 2009 IFA Championship Tournament was the final one held.

Little Iron Man

The Little Iron Man is the oldest trophy in collegiate sports, still awarded today.

It is awarded each year to the team that wins the Men's Foil competition at the Intercollegiate Fencing Association championships.

The trophy was cast in 1893 and has been awarded to the IFA Men's Foil team champion since 1896.

See also
Pre-NCAA Intercollegiate Fencing Association Champions
United States Association of Collegiate Fencing Clubs (USACFC)
National Intercollegiate Women's Fencing Association (NIWFA)

External links
Intercollegiate Fencing Association home page
ECAC home page

References
  	

NCAA Division I conferences
Fencing organizations
College fencing in the United States